Peaked Island is an uninhabited island located in the Aleutian Islands chain in Alaska. It is the westernmost point in the 50 states by direction of travel, and last sunset (at equinox) in U.S. territory. West of it passes the International Date Line, after which come Russian territorial islands.

See also
List of countries by westernmost point
List of extreme points of the United States

References

Uninhabited islands of Alaska
Islands of Unorganized Borough, Alaska
Islands of Alaska